Pontibaca is a Gram-negative genus of bacteria from the family of Rhodobacteraceae with one known species (Pontibaca methylaminivorans). Pontibaca methylaminivorans has been isolated from coastal sediments from the Sea of Japan.

References

Rhodobacteraceae
Bacteria genera
Monotypic bacteria genera